Heza is a genus of assassin bugs in the family Reduviidae. There are more than 30 described species in Heza found in the Americas.

Species
These species belong to the genus Heza:

 Heza acantharis (Linnaeus, 1767)
 Heza angulifer Barber, 1939
 Heza angustata Bruner, 1931
 Heza aurantia Maldonado, 1976
 Heza azteca Maldonado & Brailovsky, 1983
 Heza bahamensis Maldonado, 1983
 Heza binotata (Lepeletier & Serville, 1825)
 Heza canizaresi Bruner, 1946
 Heza clavata (Guérin-Méneville, 1857)
 Heza cubana Grillo, 1989-01
 Heza ephippium (Lichtenstein, 1797)
 Heza ferox Stål, 1863
 Heza funebris Maldonado, 1983
 Heza fuscinervis Champion, 1899
 Heza haitiana Maldonado, 1976
 Heza havanensis Bruner, 1931
 Heza insignis Stål, 1859
 Heza jamaicensis (Distant, 1903)
 Heza leucothorax Maldonado, 1976
 Heza maldonadoi Bérenger, 2007-01
 Heza multiannulata Stål, 1860
 Heza multiguttata Champion, 1899
 Heza ocellata Maldonado, 1976
 Heza oculata Stål, 1859
 Heza ondulata Maldonado, 1983
 Heza ornata Maldonado, 1976
 Heza perarmata (Kirby, 1901)
 Heza polita Maldonado, 1976
 Heza pulchripes Stål, 1859
 Heza punctigera (Herrich-Schaeffer, 1835)
 Heza rubra Maldonado, 1976
 Heza rubromarga Maldonado, 1976
 Heza scutellata Maldonado, 1983
 Heza sericans Stål, 1859
 Heza signoreti (Fallou, 1887)
 Heza similis Stal, 1859
 Heza sphinx Stål, 1863
 Heza ventralis Stål, 1872

References

Further reading

 
 

Reduviidae
Articles created by Qbugbot